Thapki Pyar Ki ( "A Pat of Love") is an Indian Hindi-language television series that aired on Colors TV from 2 May 2015 to 14 July 2017, completing 704 episodes. It is the story of Thapki Chaturvedi, a young woman who has a stutter. It stars Jigyasa Singh, Manish Goplani, Nitanshi Goel, Ankit Bathla, Sheena Bajaj, and Monica Khanna. 

A sequel titled Thapki Pyar Ki 2 aired on Colors TV from 4 October 2021 to 8 April 2022.

Plot

Thapki has a stutter, but does not let her speech impairment define her life. Her stutter prevents her from receiving marriage proposals. Eventually, she gets engaged to Diwakar who abandons her on the day of marriage and later marries Aditi (Thapki's sister). She always speaks with a pat so people named her Thapki.

Thapki finds employment at a TV station owned by the gentle and educated Dhruv Pandey. Soon Dhruv falls in love with Thapki, and proposes. She agrees. His mother Vasundhara disapproves of Thapki upon finding out about her stutter. She orders her adopted son, Bihaan,to marry Thapki. She does not love Bihaan as much as her biological son, Dhruv. Bihaan, who loved his mother a lot, and could never defy her, unwillingly agrees. After many failed attempts, the marriage day arrives. Vasundhara emotionally blackmails Bihaan, aware of his weakness, saying that if the marriage is not stopped she'll kill herself. Bihaan has no choice but to give in.

He stops Dhruv by reaching the mandap and closing the door of his room. He unwillingly knocks Dhruv unconscious to prevent him from reaching the mandap. Vasundhara, who is still unconvinced that this would actually prevent the marriage, blackmails Bihaan to marry Thapki instead of Dhruv. Bihaan is shocked and heartbroken, but agrees, in order to make his mother happy. He wears Dhruv's sherwani and covers his face with sehra. His elder brothers Sanjay and Ashvin came to take Dhruv, but they take Bihaan instead because they think that he is Dhruv. Bihaan takes Dhruv's place in the mandap and marries Thapki.

When Thapki learns the truth of her marriage with Bihaan, she is heartbroken. She decides to divorce him after 3 months. Thapki takes her place in Pandey Niwas as daughter-in-law. Vasundhra, in search of the perfect and ideal daughter-in-law and a suitable wife for Dhruv, comes across Shraddha. Shraddha, whose deceiving nature, manages to convince the Pandeys that she is good natured, kind, and cultured. Bihaan and Thapki, however see through her and discover her evil nature. Despite trying to inform Vasundhara, Bihaan and Thapki fail, and Dhruv and Shraddha marry.

Later, upon finding out that Dhruv still hasn't been able to move on from Thapki, Shraddha gets jealous of her and aided by Vasundhara, tries to create problems in Thapki's life. She manipulates Vasundhara into believing that Thapki is evil. She believes Shraddha and continues to make Thapki's life harder. One day Thapki rescues Vasundhara from a falling deity. She regrets her attitude for Thapki. Thapki and Bihaan fall in love. 

Dhruv starts hating Vasundhra when he learns she is the one who forced Bihaan to stop his and Thapki's marriage. Dhruv's father announces the remarriage of Thapki and Bihaan. Dhruv decides to repeat the story that Bihan did with him on his wedding day. The wedding day of Thapki and Bbihaan comes and Ddhruv hits Bihaan and takes his place. Bihaan regains consciousness and stops their marriage. Dhruv kidnaps and forcefully tries to marry Thapki. Bihaan saves her and forgives him after he regrets his behaviour. 

Two months pass and Bihaan's biological mother Kosi and step-father Naman enter. They want a kidney from Bihaan for their son Janardhan, but discover that Bihaan was born with one kidney. Thapki tells him that Kosi wants the kidney, but Bihaan doesn't believe her. Kosi, in order to move Thapki out of the way to getting Bihaan's kidney, falsely accuses her of attempting to kill her. Thapki tries to prove her innocence in front of the Pandey family, but with all evidence pointing against her, no one believes her. Enraged, Bihaan slaps Thapki. He severs all ties with her. Before leaving, Thapki writes a letter to inform Bihaan that she's pregnant, hoping that he'll not let her go, but her letter is found by Sankar who is Kosi's maid. She loves Bihaan and wants to marry him. Thapki meets with an accident and loses her unborn child.

2 years later

Thapki returns as a business tycoon, Vaani Oberoi, with Kabir Katyal, who wants revenge on Bihaan for torching the house of his sister Neha. Dhruv returns to Pandey Niwas. It is revealed that he was the one who found Thapki after her accident and has returned only to support her on her mission. Thapki and Dhruv expose Kosi, who is thrown out of the house. Kosi leaves after threatening Thapki that she wants revenge. Thapki believes that Bihaan is innocent, and is not responsible for Neha's condition and soon Kabir does, too. Thapki, Vasundhara and Neha expose Sankar as the arsonist. Later, Sankar reveals that she had caused Thapki's accident, two years before.

Sankar escapes. Dhruv divorces Shraddha and marries Aditi, Thapki's sister. Jealous, Shraddha  devises a devious plan, and Dhruv impregnates her in a drunken state. Aditi, who's also pregnant with Dhruv's child, is heartbroken. Dhruv somehow manages to prove his innocence to Aditi and family members.

Thapki and Bihaan reunite and remarry. Thapki is pregnant. Sankar and Kosi return to Pandey Niwas in disguise, seeking revenge. Sankar fakes her death and Bihaan is arrested for her presumed murder. Sankar blackmails Thapki saying Bihaan will be saved only if she leaves him. Thapki has no choice but to comply. She gives birth to twin daughters Tina and Bani, but as per the extortion is forced to tell Bihaan and his family that the girls are Kabir's daughters.

Sankar tries to kill Tina, whom Bihaan saves and adopts, unaware that she is his own daughter. Everyone assumes Tina is dead. Thapki leaves with Kabir and Bani. Shraddha reveals to Sankar that she knows she blackmailed Thapki; they form an alliance. Aditi finds out and informs Bihaan. They reach Thapki but are injured on the way when Shraddha runs them over. After they meet with the accident, the show leaps another 7 years.

7 years later
Aditi has a son Veer, and Shraddha has a daughter Ananya. Shraddha had exchanged the babies, as she wanted a son. It is revealed that following the accident, Aditi is found dead; Dhruv blames Thapki,while Bihaan has lost his memory. Shraddha and Sankar mistreat Tina. It is revealed that Shraddha and Sankar have been giving Bihaan the wrong medicines, so he never regains his memory. Thapki is now a crime reporter and lives with Bani in Agra. Bani is like Bihaan, while Tina is like Thapki. Shraddha and Sankar plot to separate Bihaan and Tina. Shraddha sends her to a boarding school in Agra, which is the same school in which Bani studies. Bani and Tina meet and befriend each other. Thapki meets Bihaan at Bani and Tina's school, and is shocked to see that he doesn't recognize her. Later, she learns about Bihaan's memory loss. She returns to help Bihaan's amnesia. Eventually, he regains his memory. Bihaan, Thapki, Bani and Tina expose Sankar in front of the family, and she is arrested. Shraddha saves herself.

Gangster Amma Mai kidnaps Bani wanting her to marry her son Prince. It is revealed that Shraddha disguised herself as Thapki to set up Bani's marriage with Amma Mai's son. Bihaan and Thapki try to save Bani. Amma Mai points her gun at Thapki, but Bihaan is shot trying to protect her. Thapki tries to prevent his fall from the cliff, but is unsuccessful and Bihaan falls to his death. The police arrest Amma Mai. Bani blames Thapki for Bihaan's death and leaves home. Kosi takes Bani in. Shraddha kidnaps Thapki. Vasundhara rescues Thapki and defeats Shraddha.

15 years later
Tina is engaged to Samar Kapoor. Bani and Kosi arrive to take revenge on Thapki. Bihaan's lookalike Aryan turns out to be the older brother of Bani's fiancé Manav Khanna, and is asked by Thapki to impersonate Bihaan. On the marriage day, Kosi creates mayhem in which Tina marries Manav and Bani marries Samar.

Bani apologizes to Thapki. Kosi is arrested. Thapki and Bani get kidnapped by Lovely, a bar dancer who is impersonating Thapki. She escapes, but is blackmailed into silence by Lovely, who threatens to kill Bani. Lovely is actually Thapki's long lost sister Mohini, who was separated from their family when she pushed her off an cliff.

Samar rescues Bani. Mohini apologises for her actions. Tina and Vasundhara have yet to forgive Thapki for messing up her daughter's life. Later, Aryan and Bani resolve the misunderstandings and Thapki is forgiven. Aryan receives an invitation to stay with the family and take Bihaan's place. He marries Thapki and everyone lives happily ever after.

Cast

Main
Jigyasa Singh as  
Vaani "Thapki" Chaudhary Khanna – Poonam and Krishnakant's eldest daughter; Varun, Aditi, Mohini and Shubh's sister; Diwakar and Dhruv's ex-fiancée; Bihaan's widow; Aryan's wife; Tina and Bani's mother (2015–2017)
Bani Pandey Kapoor – Thapki and Bihaan's elder daughter; Tina's twin sister; Manav's ex-fiancée; Samar's wife (2017)
 Nitanshi Goel as Child Bani Pandey (2017)
Manish Goplani as 
 Bihaan Pandey – Kosi and Sujeet's son; Vasundhara and Balwinder's adoptive son; Janardhan's half-brother; Dhruv, Kiran, Sanjay and Ashwin's adoptive brother; Thapki's husband; Tina and Bani's father (2015–2017) (Dead)
 Aryan Khanna – Bihaan's lookalike; Manav's brother; Thapki's second husband (2017)
Kritika Sharma	as Tina Pandey Khanna – Thapki and Bihaan's younger daughter; Bani's twin sister; Samar's ex-fiancée; Manav's wife (2017)
 Luvneet Rajput as Child Tina Pandey (2017)
Abhinandan Jindal as Manav Khanna – Aryan's brother; Bani's ex-fiancé; Tina's husband (2017)
Gaurav Wadhwa as Samar Kapoor – Tina's ex-fiancé; Bani's husband (2017)
Jaya Bhattacharya as Vasundhara "Vasu" Pandey – Balwinder's wife; Dhruv, Kiran, Sanjay and Ashwin's mother; Bihaan's adoptive mother; Ananya and Veer's grandmother; Bani and Tina's adoptive grandmother (2015–2017)
Ankit Bathla / Jatin Shah as Dhruv Pandey – Vasundhara and Balwinder's eldest son; Kiran, Sanjay and Ashwin's brother; Bihaan's adoptive brother; Thapki's ex-fiancé; Shraddha's ex-husband; Aditi's widower; Ananya and Veer's father (2015–2017)
Monica Khanna as Shraddha Pandey Siakal – Dhruv's ex-wife; Ananya's mother (2015–2017)
Sheena Bajaj / Aalisha Panwar as Aditi Chaturvedi Pandey – Poonam and Krishnakant's youngest daughter; Varun, Thapki, Mohini and Shubh's sister; Diwakar's ex-wife; Dhruv's second wife; Veer's mother (2015–2017) (Dead)
Hunar Hali as Mohini "Lovely" Chaturvedi – Poonam and Krishnakant's second daughter; Varun, Thapki, Aditi and Shubh's long-lost sister (2017)

Recurring
Jairoop Jeevan as Balwinder Pandey – Sumitra and Dilip's son; Vasundhara's husband; Dhruv, Kiran, Sanjay and Ashwin's father; Bihaan's adoptive father; Ananya and Veer's grandfather; Bani and Tina's adoptive grandfather (2015–2017) 
Vishal Thakkar as Paan – Bihaan's best friend (2015-2016)
Surjit Saha as Sunil Kumar Ahuja – Thapki's colleague (2015–2016)
Sabina Jat as Kiran Pandey – Vasundhara and Balwinder's daughter; Dhruv, Sanjay and Ashwin's sister; Bihaan's adoptive sister (2015–2016)
Dolly Chawla as Sankar Shehlawat (2016–2017)
Usha Rana as Sumitra Devi Pandey – Matriarch of the Pandey family; Dilip's wife; Balwinder's mother; Dhruv, Kiran, Sanjay and Ashwin's grandmother; Bihaan's adoptive grandmother (2015–2016)
Smita Singh as Kosi Devi Jaiswal – Sujeet's ex-wife; Naman's wife; Bihaan and Janardhan's mother (2016–2017)
Hemant Choudhary as Naman Jaiswal – Kosi's second husband; Janardhan's father (2016–2017)
Sehban Azim as Kabir Katyal – Neha's brother (2016–2017)
Kamal Sharma as Neha Rane – Kabir's sister (2016–2017)
Ankit Bhardwaj / Vikky Chaudhary as Sanjay Pandey – Vasundhara and Balwinder's second son; Dhruv, Kiran and Ashwin's brother; Bihaan's adoptive brother; Suman's husband (2015–2016)
 Pooja Sahu as Suman Pandey – Sanjay's wife (2015–2017)
Sanjay Pandya as Ashwin Pandey: Vasundhara and Balwinder's youngest son; Dhruv, Kiran and Sanjay's brother; Bihaan's adoptive brother; Preeti's husband (2015–2017)
Resham Thakkar as Preeti Pandey – Ashwin's wife (2015–2017)
Sia Bhatia as Ananya "Anu" Pandey – Shraddha and Dhruv's daughter; Veer's half-sister (2017)
Atharva Phadnis as Veeransh "Veer" Pandey – Aditi and Dhruv's son; Ananya's half-brother (2017)
Jaanvi Sangwan as Shagun Kumari/ Amma Mai – Prince's mother (2017)
Rehaan Roy as Monty Shekhawat (2017)
Vishal Jethwa as Prince Shekhawat (2017)
Hetal Gada as Kesar Singh (2017)
Aakash Talwar as Janardhan "John" Jaiswal – Kosi and Naman's son; Bihaan's half-brother (2016)
Sharan Kaur as Sheena Arora – Bihaan's childhood friend (2016)
Hardik Sangani as Diwakar Mishra – Thapki's ex-fiancé; Aditi's ex husband( 2015–2016)
Shakti Singh as Krishnakant Chaturvedi – Poonam's husband; Varun, Thapki, Aditi, Mohini and Shubh's father; . (2015–2016)
Prateeksha Lonkar as Poonam Rai Chaturvedi – Krishnakant's wife; Varun, Thapki, Aditi, Mohini and Shubh's mother. (2015–2016)
Shubh Kalra as Shubh Chaturvedi – Poonam and Krishnakant's son; Varun, Thapki, Aditi and Mohini's brother (2015)
Shrishti Maheshwari as Sakshi Manjulkar (2015)
Amit Singh as Anshuman Roy (2015)

Sequel
In September 2021, Colors TV announced the spiritual sequel of the series, titled Thapki Pyar Ki 2, starring Jigyasa Singh (later replaced by Prachi Bansal) and Aakash Ahuja.

This sequel revolves around Veena Devi Singhania, a Well Known Singer, her Son, Purab Singhania who is the Head of Veena Records and Thapki who is ambitious of becoming a Renowned Singer like Veena Devi and consider her as Idol.

Awards and nominations

References

External links
 

2015 Indian television series debuts
2017 Indian television series endings
Indian television soap operas
Colors TV original programming
Hindi-language television shows